Ans Luttge-Deetman (1867-1952) was a Dutch painter.

Biography 
Luttge-Deetman née Deetman was born on 10 August 1902 in Zwolle. She  attended the Dagtekenschool voor meisjes (Day drawing school for girls) in Amsterdam, Rijksakademie van beeldende kunsten (State Academy of Fine Arts), the Instituut voor Kunstnijverheidsonderwijs (Institute for Applied Arts Education), and the Rijksinstituut tot Opleiding van Tekenleraren (National Institute for the Training of Drawing Teachers). She was married to fellow artist .

Luttge-Deetman's work was included in the 1939 exhibition and sale Onze Kunst van Heden (Our Art of Today) at the Rijksmuseum in Amsterdam.

Luttge-Deetman died on 16 September 1993 in Weesp.

References

External links 
images of Luttge-Deetman's work on ArtNet

People from Zwolle
20th-century Dutch women artists
1867 births
1952 deaths